The Province of 24 Szepes Towns, also known as the Union of 24 Szepes Towns, and until c. 1344, as the Community of Szepesian Saxons, and the Province of Szepesian Saxons, was a seat, an autonomous administrative division, within Szepes County, Kingdom of Hungary. It existed from 1271 to 1412. On 8 November 1412, with the Spiš Pledge, in which Hungary had pledged part of Szepes County to the Kingdom of Poland, with the province was divided into Province of 11 Szepes Towns in Hungary, and Province of 13 Spisz Towns in Poland.

History 
The autonomous region of the Province of Szepesian Saxons has been established in 1277, with Stephen V, King of Hungary, giving the privileges to the German population of the settlers in the area of Hornád and Poprad. In 1317, the privileges were once again confirmed and extended by King Charles I, because the Szepesian Germans had helped him to defeat the oligarchs of the Kingdom of Hungary in the battle of Rozgony in 1312. The territory was granted self-government privileges similar to those of the royal free towns. In 1317, the special territory included 43 settlements, including Lőcse (present-day Levoča) and Késmárk (present-day Kežmarok), which however withdrew before 1344. Originally Lőcse was the seat of the government of the province. From 1370 the 41 settlements of the territory subscribed to a uniform special Szepes law system. By 1344, the territory was reduced to 24 settlements and later its name was changed to Province of 24 Szepes Towns. The province was led by the Count (Graf) of Szepes elected by the town judges of the 24 towns. It existed until 1412, when, with the Spiš Pledge, in which Hungary had pledges part of Szepes County to the Kingdom of Poland, the province was divided into Province of 11 Szepes Towns in Hungary, and Province of 13 Spisz Towns in Poland.

Towns 
 Spišská Nová Ves
 Spišské Vlachy
 Spišské Podhradie
 Poprad
 Veľká
 Spišská Sobota
 Stráže pod Tatrami
 Matejovce
 Spišská Belá
 Vrbov
 Ľubica
 Ruskinovce
 Tvarožná, Kežmarok District
 Spišský Štvrtok
 Iliašovce
 Žakovce
 Hrabušice
 Kurimany
 Mlynica
 Veľký Slavkov
 Odorín
 Bystrany
 Vlkovce
 Kežmarok (before 1344)
 Levoča (before 1344)

Citations

Notes

References

Bibliography 
 Zuzanna Krempaská, Sixteen Scepus Towns from 1412 to 1876. Spišska Nova Vés, Spiš Museum. ISBN 9788085173062.
 Encyklopédia Slovenska, VEDA, Bratislava, 1980

Province of 24 Szepes Towns
Province of 24 Szepes Towns
Province of 24 Szepes Towns
Province of 24 Szepes Towns
 13th-century establishments in Europe
 15th-century disestablishments in Europe
 States and territories established in 1271
 States and territories disestablished in 1412